Araken Patusca (17 July 1905 – 24 January 1990) was a Brazilian footballer who played as a striker. He was born in Santos.

Throughout his career (1923–1937), he played for Santos FC, Club Athletico Paulistano, Clube de Regatas do Flamengo, São Paulo. Having been three consecutive times runner-up with Santos (1927, 1928, 1929) at the Campeonato Paulista, he won the title with them in 1931, and then in 1935 with Independente. With Siriri, Feitiço, Evengelista and Camarão formed one of the most important attacking lines of the 1920s. In 1928, he was the top goalscorer of the Campeonato Paulista.

He scored the 1000th goal in Santos FC history against Atlas Flamengo in 1929. In total he scored 182 goals in 193 matches for Santos and is considered a club idol.

With the Brazil national team he participated in the first edition of the World Cup in 1930, playing one match against Yugoslavia. He was the only player from São Paulo (state) to represent the national team at the inaugural tournament, going against the wishes of the CBD that wanted to take only players in activity in Rio de Janeiro. In the end, he signed for Flamengo to be able to travel with the team, but never played a single game at the club. He died at 84 years old.

Honours

Club
 Campeonato Paulista:
São Paulo: 1931
Santos FC: 1935

Individual
 Campeonato Paulista top scorer: 
Santos FC: 1927 (31 goals)

References and footnotes

1905 births
1990 deaths
Sportspeople from Santos, São Paulo
1930 FIFA World Cup players
Brazilian footballers
Brazil international footballers
Santos FC players
São Paulo FC players
Association football forwards